This is a glossary of commutative algebra.

See also list of algebraic geometry topics, glossary of classical algebraic geometry, glossary of algebraic geometry, glossary of ring theory and glossary of module theory.

In this article, all rings are assumed to be commutative with identity 1.

!$@

A

B

C

D

E

F

G

H 

.

I

J

K

L

M

N

O

P

Q

R

S

T

U

V

W

XYZ

See also 

 Glossary of ring theory

References 

 
 
 
 
 
 
 
 
 
 
 
 

Commutative algebra
 
Wikipedia glossaries using description lists